Emil Ekiyor Jr. (born January 22, 2000) is an American football offensive guard for the Alabama Crimson Tide.

High school career
Ekiyor attended Cathedral High School in Indianapolis, Indiana. He was selected to play in the 2018 U.S. Army All-American Game. He originally committed to the University of Michigan to play college football before switching to the University of Alabama.

College career
Ekiyor played in 12 games as a backup his first two years at Alabama in 2018 and 2019. In 2020, he took over as a starter and started all 13 games. He started all 15 games in 2021 and returned to Alabama as a starter in 2022.

References

External links
Alabama Crimson Tide bio

Living people
Players of American football from Indianapolis
American football offensive guards
Alabama Crimson Tide football players
2000 births